Aepinus is a small lunar impact crater located along the northern lunar limb, close to the north pole of the Moon. To the south east is the prominent crater Hermite.

This crater was unnamed until it was given a name along with 18 other craters by the IAU on January 22, 2009. It was named after the German-Russian astronomer Franz Aepinus (c. 1724 – c. 1802).

References

External links
 

Impact craters on the Moon